Alastair McDonald (born 28 October 1941) is a Scottish banjo-playing folk and jazz musician.

McDonald has mainly recorded songs written by other songwriters, such as Robert Burns and Jim MacLean, but has also written songs himself (Culloden's Harvest, The Village Green at Gretna), and reworked traditional songs (The Bell Rock Light, Mingulay Boat Song). He has toured the United States (every state except Hawaii and Alaska), Canada, Israel, Denmark, and Thailand. Much of his work in recent years has been political songs, usually socialist and/or republican, such as his tribute song to John MacLean and The Wee German Lairdie. He supports Scottish independence. He is also seen regularly performing the honky tonk.

McDonald lives in Netherlee, East Renfrewshire.

Discography
Scotland First (1970) Nevis (NEV LP108)
Scottish Battle Ballads (1973)
Scotland In Song Alastair McDonald and Leo Maguire (1993)
Bonnie Prince Charlie with Leo Maguire (2003)
Songs of Scotland (2012)

References

External links
 Profile at Corban Recordings

1941 births
Living people
Scottish banjoists
Scottish folk musicians
Scottish folk singers